= Ganwick House =

18th-century house in England

Coordinates: 51°40′45″N 0°11′10″W

Ganwick House is a late-18th-century house in Wagon Road, Ganwick Corner (Gannic Corner), near Chipping Barnet, England. As of 2018, it was in use as a residential-care home for men with autism and learning difficulties. It is Grade II listed with Historic England.
